Sir John Coghill, 1st Baronet (died 1785), also known as John Mayne, was a British politician.

Born John Mayne, he assumed the surname of Coghill upon his marriage to Hester Coghill, an heiress. Between 1780 and his death he represented Newport in the House of Commons. He was created a baronet, of Richings in the Baronetage of Great Britain on 24 March 1781. He died without issue at which point the title became extinct.

References

Year of birth unknown
1785 deaths
British MPs 1780–1784
British MPs 1784–1790
Baronets in the Baronetage of Great Britain